The Sudbury Community Arena is a multi-purpose arena in the downtown core of Greater Sudbury, Ontario, Canada. It was built in 1951, on the site of the former Central Public School, at a cost of $700,000. The approval and construction of the arena was overseen by Sudbury Mayor Bill Beaton. It is home to the Sudbury Wolves of the Ontario Hockey League.

It has an ice surface of 200' x 85', with a capacity of 4,640 seated, 5,100 standing and is wheelchair accessible.

During the summer of 2007, the arena underwent extensive renovations, which added 12 private boxes and a new club seating section, with padded seats and refreshments services along with new washrooms, concession stand and lounge. Seating was sacrificed to make way for the improvements. Standing room capacity was shrunk from 1,000 to 500, while seating capacity was dropped by 150. The new arena capacity, with standing room patrons, became 5,100, down from 5,750.

On November 5, 2015, a life size statue of Stompin' Tom Connors was unveiled on the grounds of the arena. The reason behind the statue was due to one of Connors' most famous songs, Sudbury Saturday Night.

The arena is featured extensively in the Canadian television show Shoresy, where it serves as home of the fictional Senior hockey Sudbury Bulldogs.

Gallery

References

External links
 
 Sudbury Community Arena
 Sudbury Community Arena Seating Chart

Sports venues in Greater Sudbury
Indoor arenas in Ontario
Indoor ice hockey venues in Canada
Ontario Hockey League arenas
Music venues in Ontario
Sudbury Five